Qaleh-ye Aref (also Romanized as Qal‘eh-ye ‘Āref) is a village in Karimabad Rural District, Sharifabad District, Pakdasht County, Tehran Province, Iran. At the 2006 census, its population was 40, in 14 families.

References 

Populated places in Pakdasht County